Cheyenne East High School is a public high school (grades 9-12) located in Cheyenne, Wyoming, United States, It serves Laramie County School District #1. The school enrolls students who attended Carey JHS, Alta Vista ES, Anderson ES, Baggs ES, Buffalo Ridge ES, Dildine ES, Henderson ES, and Saddle Ridge in Cheyenne.  The current principal is Sam Mirich.

As of the 2014-15 school year, the school had an enrollment of 1,532 students and 113 classroom teachers (on an FTE basis), for a student–teacher ratio of 13.6:1. There were 301 students (19.6% of enrollment) eligible for free lunch and 127 (8.3% of students) eligible for reduced-cost lunch.

Academics
East offers numerous AP courses, as well as the International Baccalaureate program, an advanced curricular course that encompasses all of a student's core classes. It also encourages students to participate in many beneficial programs such as The Congressional Award and National Honor Society.

Athletics
The East High School Football team has won the state championship five times: in 1970, 1974, 2007, 2013, and 2020. The East High Cheerleaders placed first in all-girl stunt in 2004, 2008 and 2010. The East High Lady Thunderbirds basketball team won the state title in 4A basketball in 2010. In 2011, the Cheyenne East boys' indoor track team won the state title. The Lady Thunderbirds volleyball and swim teams took home state championships in 2012. The Lady Thunderbirds soccer team won consecutive state titles in 2013 and 2014. The T-Birds won state football in 2013.

East's primary sport rival is Cheyenne Central High School.

Speech and Debate
The Speech and Debate team has placed in State and District Sweepstakes for the last eight years.  Cheyenne East hosts a "Holiday Classic" every year right before Christmas vacation, schools from all over Wyoming and Colorado attend.

Marching Band
Cheyenne East Marching Band goes to the State Marching Festival every year and has scored the top possible score since 1999.  They were State Champions in 1983, 1984, 1986, 1987, 1988, and 1989.

Extracurricular activities and groups
Activities and clubs include AFJROTC, Improv Club, Computer Club, football, volleyball, cross country, golf, boys' and girls' swimming, boys' and girls' tennis, wrestling, boys' and girls' basketball, indoor & outdoor track, boys' and girls' soccer, cheerleading, Dance Team, Art Club, American Sign Language Club, Christian Student Ministries, French Club, German Club, Japanese Club, Spanish Club, Key Club, Debate & Forensics, National Honor Society, Student Council, Chess Club, Drill Team, Thunderwarriors, Hackey Sack Club, Gay-Straight Alliance, Band, Choir, Orchestra, Marching Band, Strolling Strings, Drama, Mock Trial, We the People, Wyoming Academic Challenge, DECA, FBLA, SkillsUSA, FCCLA, FFA, and FCA.

Notable alumni

 James Johnson - professional basketball player, Brooklyn Nets
 Daniel Junge - Academy Award-winning documentary filmmaker; best known for Saving Face
 Aaron Keen - college football coach
 Cynthia Lummis - United States Senator and former member of the U.S. House of Representatives
 Brad McCaslin - college football coach
 Brandon Nimmo—outfielder for New York Mets
 Tracy Ringolsby - columnist for MLB.com; 1995 J.G. Taylor Spink Award winner; recognized by the Baseball Hall of Fame

References

External links
 East High website

Buildings and structures in Cheyenne, Wyoming
Public high schools in Wyoming
Educational institutions established in 1960
Schools in Laramie County, Wyoming
1960 establishments in Wyoming